Elizabeth Ann Russell (born 22 May 1994) is an English cricketer who currently plays for Warwickshire, Central Sparks and Northern Superchargers. She plays as a right-arm medium bowler.

Early life
Russell was born on 22 May 1994 in Solihull, West Midlands.

Domestic career
Russell made her county debut in 2008, for Warwickshire against Lancashire. In her first season she was her side's joint-leading wicket-taker, with 8 wickets including 4/32 taken against Surrey. In 2010, she took 15 wickets at an average of 20.53 in the County Championship, the most for her side. In both the 2012 and 2013 County Championships, Russell took 12 wickets, and in 2013 she took her maiden county five-wicket haul, with 5/13 against Essex. Two years later, against the same opponents, she took her first Twenty20 five-wicket haul, 5/19. In 2016 she hit her maiden county half-century, scoring 51 against Somerset.

Russell had a strong season in 2017, as she took 10 wickets at an average of 7.50 in the County Championship and 9 wickets at an average of 10.66 in the Twenty20 Cup. In 2019, she again took 10 wickets in the County Championship, as well as helping her side to the Division 1 title in the Twenty20 Cup. Russell took five wickets at an average of 31.50 in the 2022 Women's Twenty20 Cup.

In 2020, Russell played for Central Sparks in the Rachael Heyhoe Flint Trophy. She appeared in 5 matches, taking 6 wickets at an average of 29.00. Her best performance came in the Sparks' victory over Northern Diamonds, where she took 4/28. She took 4 wickets for her side in the 2021 Rachael Heyhoe Flint Trophy, as well as appearing once in the 2021 Charlotte Edwards Cup. She also signed for Northern Superchargers in The Hundred as a temporary replacement for Helen Fenby due to illness. She played 7 matches for the side, taking two wickets. She played seven matches for Central Sparks in 2022, across the Charlotte Edwards Cup and the Rachael Heyhoe Flint Trophy, taking eight wickets. She also played one match for Northern Superchargers in The Hundred.

References

External links

1994 births
Living people
Sportspeople from Solihull
Warwickshire women cricketers
Central Sparks cricketers
Northern Superchargers cricketers